"" is the opening line of Canto VII of Dante Alighieri's . The line, consisting of three words, is famous for the uncertainty of its meaning, and there have been many attempts to interpret it. Modern commentators on the  view it as some kind of demonic invocation to Satan.

Text
The line is a shout by Plutus.
The full strophe, plus the following four, which describes Dante's and Virgil's entire meeting and confrontation with Plutus reads:

The scant information that can be gleaned from the text is this:

Virgil understands the meaning ("And that benignant Sage, who all things knew..."), and is replying.
That the line is just the beginning of something else ("Thus Plutus with his clucking voice began...).
It is an expression of anger ("And said: "Be silent, thou accursed wolf / Consume within thyself with thine own rage.").
That it has the effect of a threat to Dante (And that benignant Sage, who all things knew, / Said, to encourage me: "Let not thy fear / Harm thee; for any power that he may have / Shall not prevent thy going down this crag.").

Possible explanations

The only word with fairly obvious meaning is "", namely Satan; which comes from the Hebrew word , which translated literally means "the adversary".

The earliest interpretations

Some interpretations from the earliest commentators on the Divine Comedy include:
The word "pape" might be a rendering of Latin , or from Greek . Both words are interjections of anger or surprise, attested in ancient authors (comparable to the English "damn!", or just "oh!").
The word "" could be an Italian version of the word for "", the Hebrew letter  (compare Phoenician  and Greek ). In Hebrew,  also means "number one" or "the origin that contains everything". It may also be interpreted as a metaphor for the "head", "the first and foremost". This was an attribute for God in late medieval expressions, meaning "the majesty" (of God). "Alef" was also a medieval interjection (like "Oh God!").

With these interpretations, the verse would mean "Oh, Satan, o Satan, god, king!".

The prayer theory

The word "pape" might come from Latin , an old Roman term for "emperor", or "father". The double mention of "pape" together with "Satan" (here interpreted as the fallen angel Satan) and the break (the comma) in the hendecasyllable, gives it a tone of a prayer or an invocation to Satan, although there is no apparent verb. It might be also an invocation of the evil within the intruders.

Domenico Guerri's theory

Domenico Guerri researched medieval glossaries thoroughly in 1908, and interpreted it as "Oh Satan, oh Satan, God", which he wrote was meant as an invocation against travellers.

Abboud Rashid's theory

Abboud Abu Rashid, the first translator of the Divine Comedy into Arabic (1930–1933), interpreted this verse as a phonetic translation of the spoken Arabic, "", meaning "The door of Satan, the door of Satan, proceed downward!". According to some scholars, although Dante did not speak Arabic, he could have drawn some inspiration from Islamic sources. Doubts arise, however, because the meaning of this interpretation does not really match the reaction of Dante and Virgil (anger and fear), nor Virgil's answer, and Dante directly indicts Muhammad (or Mahomet) as a spreader of religious schism

The Hebrew theory
Some commentators claim that the sentence is phonetic Hebrew, "". This would be the opposite of the sentence that Jesus spoke in the Gospel according to St Matthew 16:18, "...and the gates of Hell shall not prevail against it".  The meaning of this utterance would be that Hell (Satan) has conquered.

The French theories

Two suggestions have been proposed interpreting the words of Plutus as French.

The first reads: "" ("Peace, peace, Satan, peace, peace, Satan, let's go, peace!"). The latter phrase can be interpreted as "Satan, make peace!". Benvenuto Cellini, in his autobiography, reports hearing the phrase in Paris, transliterating it as "" and interpreting it as "Be quiet! Be quiet Satan, get out of here and be quiet."

The second interpretation, elaborating on the first, is: "" ("No peace, Satan! No peace, Satan! To the sword!"). According to Giovanni Ventura, Dante's intention was to hide Philip IV of France behind Plutus, god of greed, and that was the reason why Plutus was made to speak French instead of Greek. Dante considered Philip the Handsome as the enemy of Christianity, and of Papacy, due to his rapacity. The words of Plutus are also a blaspheme quotation of Jesus' words in the Gospel Matthew 10:34 ("Think not that I am come to send peace on earth: I came not to send [or bring] peace, but a sword."). This interpretation implies a transposition of the tonic accent, for metrical purposes, from the 11th to the 10th syllable, from "" to "", similarly to what happens at line 28, where the tonic accent shifts from "pur lì" to "pùr li".

The Flemish theory 
Dante would clearly indicate that he heard these words as "with clucking voice" because of the guttural pronunciation of "" (especially the "l": in Flemish/Dutch as in English, "" is indeed the ""), typical of that dialect. By the phenomena known as anaptyxis and perhaps paragogy, typical of the Tuscan dialect of his day (as in "salamelecco" from Salam' alaykum, also in modern Italian usage, and in "amecche" from Hebrew "amech" or "amcha" in Inf., XXXI, 67), Dante arrives at the transcription found in the Poem. The reason Dante might have used specifically the Flemish dialect of Bruges is the intense commercial relationships between Florence and Bruges since as early as the XIII century and explicitly mentioned by the Poet in the Poem (with two references to Bruges and with further references to the Tuscan families involved in business there). Dante would also have known Plutus as the god of wealth from Cicero's . The verse would then be allusive to Matthew's Gospel (Mt., 16, 21-23), and its intended meaning would be to condemn the exercising of temporal power by the Western Church.

As a comment, the French theories are less convincing, as Dante knew French through his master Brunetto Latini (who wrote his  in French and is remembered in Inferno) and in view of the fact that French was already in the XIII-XIV centuries well widespread commerce language (especially also with the Flemish country, aside with Latin). Moreover, Dante uses  in  without any phonetic transcription and in a quite long passage and that language is directly related to medieval French.

Sources
This article is partially translated from the Italian Wikipedia.

External links
The full Divine Comedy at Wikisource
Pictures from Divine Comedy by Gustave Doré

Divine Comedy
Fiction about the Devil
Gibberish language